Epipyrops epityraea is a moth in the Epipyropidae family. It was described by Scheven in 1974. It is found in Tanzania.

The larvae live in coccid colonies of the species Ityraea patricia, found on the liana Hippocratea africana.

References

Endemic fauna of Tanzania
Moths described in 1974
Epipyropidae